No Silence For Sale is an Austrian rock band formed in Vienna, capital of Austria, in 1999 by Felix Deimel and Georg The-Hatschka. In 2001 Raphael Beran joined and the band continued as a trio. The band emerged from 1990s skate- punk culture with fast melodies combined with a radio-friendly kind of punk rock. After playing several shows as Support act of 3 Feet Smaller, Short, My Manner, No Head on My Shoulders and many more, the band declared an immediate, indefinite hiatus in January 2004.

Reunion
In October 2011 the band announced their reunion on Facebook and started recording their first demos. After their announcement they played a number of shows as supporting act of Bam Margera, Dog Eat Dog, Defrage and many more. No Silence For Sale took a break from the road after May 2015 to begin pre-production for their debut album.

On February 26, 2016, they released their self-produced debut single "Tonight" worldwide.

References

External links
 Website

Musical groups established in 1999
Austrian punk rock groups
1999 establishments in Austria